UNC is a three-letter abbreviation that may refer to:

Education
 University of Northern California (disambiguation), which may refer to:
 University of Northern California (Santa Rosa), in Petaluma, California, United States
 University of Northern California, Lorenzo Patiño School of Law in Sacramento, California, United States
 The University of North Carolina system in the United States
 University of North Carolina at Chapel Hill, the flagship campus of the UNC system
 North Carolina Tar Heels, the athletic program of the Chapel Hill campus
 University of Northern Colorado in Greeley, Colorado, United States
 Universidad Nacional de Córdoba in Córdoba, Argentina
 Universidad Nacional de Cajamarca, Spanish name of National University of Cajamarca
 Universitas Nicolai Copernici, Latin name of Nicolaus Copernicus University in Toruń, Poland
 Université de la Nouvelle-Calédonie (University of New Caledonia), the French university located in Nouméa, New Caledonia
 University of Nueva Caceres in Naga City, Camarines Sur, Philippines

Politics
 Cameroonian National Union, a political party
 Union for the Congolese Nation, a political party in the Democratic Republic of the Congo
 United National Congress, a political party in Trinidad and Tobago
 United Nations Command, a multinational military force established to support the Republic of Korea (South Korea) during and after the Korean War
 Unlawful Non-Citizen, see Illegal immigration

Other
 Uncategorized, in reference to cyber threat groups as in UNC1151
 Uncirculated coin
 Unified coarse (or unified national coarse), a description of screw threads; see American Unified Thread Standard
 Uniform Naming Convention, for Microsoft Windows systems
 Unguía Airport (IATA code: UNC), in Colombia
 United Nuclear Corporation, a nuclear mining, development, and applications company in operation from 1961 to 1997